Eric P. Skaar is an American microbiologist, the Ernest W. Goodpasture Professor of Pathology, Microbiology and Immunology at Vanderbilt University Medical Center.

Education and career 
Skaar earned his Bachelor of Science degree in Bacteriology at the University of Wisconsin-Madison in 1996, and his Ph.D. in Immunology and Microbial Pathogenesis and Master’s Degree in Public Health in Biostatistics and Epidemiology at Northwestern University in 2002. After completing a postdoctoral fellowship in Microbiology at the University of Chicago, Skaar joined the Vanderbilt faculty in 2005 as an assistant professor, and was named to the endowed Ernest W. Goodpasture Chair in Pathology in 2012.

He is the Vice Chair for Research in the Department of Pathology, Microbiology and Immunology, and the Director of the Vanderbilt Institute for Infection, Immunology, and Inflammation (VI4).

The Skaar laboratory focuses on nutritional immunity which studies that aspect of the innate immune response to infectious diseases. They have studied (i) nutrient acquisition by bacterial pathogens, (ii) how vertebrate immune proteins sequester nutrients during the pathogenesis of infection and cancer,  (iii) competition for nutrients between pathogens and the healthy microbiome, and (iv) the impact of diet on infection. His research has resulted in  approximately 200 published research articles.

Research 
In order for bacterial pathogens to cause disease, they must obtain nutrients inside their vertebrate hosts. The primary nutrients that are limiting to the growth of bacteria inside vertebrates are metals, because vertebrates have developed numerous metal chelation systems that serve as a host defense against microbial infection. This is one of the aspects of the general concept called nutritional immunity. The Skaar laboratory is interested in identifying the host and bacterial factors that are involved in this competition for metal during the  host-pathogen interaction. In particular, they focus on diseases caused by the human pathogens Staphylococcus aureus , Bacillus anthracis (Anthrax), i, and Clostridioides difficile  The long term goal of the research is to develop novel therapies to treat microbial diseases.

 Awards 
Skaar is a Fellow of the American Academy of Microbiology (ASM) and the American Association for the Advancement of Science (AAAS). He has also been the recipient of the Pfizer Aspire Award, the Searle Scholars Award, the ICAAC/IDSA Young Investigator Award, the Chancellor’s award for Research, the Stanley Cohen Award for Research, and was named a Burroughs Wellcome Investigator in the Pathogenesis of Infectious Diseases.

 Notable publications 
Zackular JP,... Skaar EP (2016). Dietary zinc alters the microbiota and decreases resistance to Clostridium difficile infection. Nature medicine 22 (11), pgs: 1330-1334

Cassat JE, Skaar EP (2013). Iron in Infection and Immunity. Cell host & microbe 13 (5), pgs: 509-519

Hood MI, Skaar EP (2012). Nutritional immunity: transition metals at the pathogen–host interface. Nature Reviews Microbiology 10 (8), pgs: 525-537

Corbin BD,... Skaar EP (2008). Metal Chelation and Inhibition of Bacterial Growth in Tissue Abscesses. Science 305 (5690), pgs:1626-1628

Skaar EP,... Schneewind O (2004). Iron-Source Preference of Staphylococcus aureus Infections. Science'' 305 (5690), pgs:1626-1628

References 

Living people
American microbiologists
Northwestern University alumni
People from Toms River, New Jersey
University of Wisconsin–Madison alumni
1974 births